The flag of the state of Maine features Maine's state coat of arms on a blue field. In the center of the shield, a moose rests under a tall pine tree. A farmer and seaman represent the traditional reliance on agriculture and the sea by the state. The North Star represents the state motto: dirigo ("I Lead").

The design commonly used omits the circular ring prescribed by Maine Law as a part of the Maine Arms and moves the "Sea and Forest Scene" from the outside of the shield to the inside of the shield. There are no known flags of the State that conform to the official description.

There are no official colors for the coat of arms, so variations in coloration can be seen in flags from different manufacturers. The blue field, however, is specified to be the same blue as in the flag of the United States. According to the official description, the flag should have a fringe of yellow silk and should have a blue and white silk cord attached at the spearhead. These embellishments are very rarely observed.

The law establishing the flag was enacted on February 23, 1909, and was modeled after flags used in the American Civil War:

§206. State flag. A flag made in accordance with the description given in this section shall be kept in the office of the Adjutant General as a model.”

Maine is one of 26 U.S. states that use a blue flag with the state arms or seal on them.

The North American Vexillological Association (NAVA) conducted a survey in 2001 that ranked Maine's current flag as one of the worst in design. Amongst the 72 U.S. state, U.S. territorial and Canadian provincial flags, Maine's flag ranked 60th (13th worst). NAVA criticized the unoriginality of "[state] seal on blue bed-sheet" design, which is currently used by over half of the flags of U.S. states.

History

Original flag 
Originally, the 1901 Maine Flag consisted of a green pine tree, a Native symbol of New England and freedom, in the center, with a blue "North Star", all on a buff-colored background.

The Maine legislature approved the current flag of Maine on February 24, 1909.

Ensign 
Maine is also one of only two states with a separate ensign, which is rarely seen (the other is Massachusetts). It features symbols from the current flag and the older one, with a white field and green pine tree. The green pine tree has the seaman's anchor, and the words "MAINE" and "DIRIGO" around it.

A photograph of the earliest-known specimen of the Maine merchant and marine flag was featured in a June 1939 International News Photos wire photo.

First Militia Flags 
Maine had a semi official state color used by its militia from 1822 to 1861. After separating from Massachusetts in 1820, the Maine Adjutant General Samuel Cony needed to supply flags for Maine's approximately 100 militia companies because one of the articles of separation required Maine to return all militia flags (but it failed to mention poles, which were retained and reused). Casting about for a cost-effective method of producing such quantity of flags, he engaged John R. Penniman of Boston in 1822 to provide a suitable design which was engraved onto a copper plate and then printed onto silk in multi-colors, the first known production of such for flags. A second printing was done in 1827. About a dozen or so portions of these flags still exist, including one at the Maine Historical Society still mounted on its original pole. The last known instance of a Maine militia unit using this flag was in 1861 at the First Battle of Bull Run, which was recorded as being captured by Confederate forces.

Flag of the 20th Maine 
Several flags were used by the 20th Maine Volunteer Infantry Regiment during the American Civil War.

Bicentennial Flag of 2020 

In 2019, Maine lawmakers introduced a bill to adopt a simpler flag for the state, based on the original 1901 flag. A flag with a buff background, a blue star, and green pine tree from the Merchant and Marine flag, created by the Maine Flag Company, was one of the proposed options. Maine resident Jeff Van West also submitted a design for the new flag. His flag had a white star on a dark blue of a night sky over a lighter blue representing the rivers, ponds, and oceanfront of Maine. He had the tree extend off the flag border to give the feeling of being in the forest looking out over the water. 

The measure to change the state flag failed. However, the legislature approved creating a flag for Maine's Bicentennial in 2020. Secretary of State Matt Dunlap submitted three designs for public comment: one of his own design, one using the Maine Bicentennial Committee logo, and a third based on Van West's flag, but replacing the white star with the full-color Dirigo Star from the state flag. After the third design won the contest, Van West offered Dunlap a further revision replacing the colored Dirigo Star with a simplified white one. Dunlap approved that version as the Maine 2020 Bicentennial Flag.

Other Flags Used

See also

Great Seal of the State of Maine
Symbols of the State of Maine

References

External links

Maine
Symbols of Maine
Maine
1909 establishments in Maine
Maine